Luca Prina (born May 11, 1965) is an Italian football coach, last in charge as head coach of Serie C side Pro Patria.

Career
Prina started his career in 2006 as head coach of Serie D amateurs Pro Belvedere Vercelli, obtaining a ninth place by the end of the season. In 2008–09 he guided Serie D club Biellese to promotion (then revoked due to financial issues involving the club). The following season, he took his first professional role as head coach at Lega Pro Seconda Divisione club Canavese.

In April 2011 he took over at another Lega Pro Seconda Divisione club, Virtus Entella. After saving the club from relegation, he guided Virtus Entella to promotion to Lega Pro Prima Divisione in 2011–12.

In 2012–13, Virtus Entella emerged as a promotion outsider, qualifying for the post-season playoffs thanks to an impressive fifth place and then being defeated by Lecce in a two-legged semi-final. This was followed by an even more successful finish in the 2013–14 Lega Pro Prima Divisione, as Virtus Entella managed to top the league for almost the full season and winning promotion to Serie B for its first time ever.

As head coach of a newly promoted Serie B club, Prina was therefore successfully admitted to the yearly UEFA Pro Licence course to be held in Coverciano.

He was removed from head coach on 12 April 2015, after a negative string of results led his club into relegation zone in the Serie B.

On 14 March 2016, he was named new head coach of relegation-threatened Lega Pro club Mantova, guiding the club to retaining their professional status after playoffs. On 28 November 2016, he was sacked after a negative start to the season, with the club bottom of the league.

Prina returned to football in April 2018, as new Under-19 coach of Chievo, following Lorenzo D'Anna's  promotion as head coach. He left the club in June 2018 to be replaced by Paolo Mandelli.

On 7 October 2018 he joined Serie D club Rezzato as new head coach, with 2006 FIFA World Cup winner Alberto Gilardino as his assistant. On 28 February 2019, Gilardino was promoted to head coach of Rezzato, with Prina demoted to the supervisory role.

On 22 June 2021, Prina accepted to return into management as the new head coach of Serie C club Pro Patria on a one-year contract. He was dismissed on 1 March 2022, leaving Pro Patria in relegation zone.

References

1965 births
Living people
People from Biella
Italian football managers
Virtus Entella managers
Aurora Pro Patria 1919 managers
A.S.D. La Biellese managers
Serie B managers
Serie C managers
Sportspeople from the Province of Biella